Charles Patrick (13 January 1866 – 29 November 1919) was an Australian cricketer. He played six first-class matches for New South Wales and Queensland between 1893/94 and 1903/04.

See also
 List of New South Wales representative cricketers

References

External links
 

1866 births
1919 deaths
Australian cricketers
New South Wales cricketers
Queensland cricketers
Cricketers from Sydney